Lake Magpie is a lake in the Côte-Nord region of the province of Quebec, Canada. It forms the middle part of the Magpie River.

Location

Lake Magpie is in the unorganized territory of Lac-Jérôme in the Minganie Regional County Municipality.
It can only be reached by float plane.
A map of the ecological regions of Quebec shows the lake in sub-region 6j-S of the east spruce/moss subdomain.
The lake is named for the Canada jay (Perisoreus canadensis), a bird closely related to the magpie.

Description

It is large, narrow and very deep, and is fed from the east and west by several streams.

It is bordered on each side by capes and mountains.

The lake and surrounding area have been protected against logging, mining or hydroelectric projects since 19 June 2003, with plans to make it a biodiversity reserve.
The Pourvoirie du Lac Magpie provides non-exclusive outfitting services from a camp at the north end of the lake.
Fish include lake trout, landlocked salmon and northern pike.
Hunters may shoot black bear and moose.

Notes

Sources

Lakes of Côte-Nord